Alpha oxidation (α-oxidation) is a process by which certain branched-chain fatty acids are broken down by removal of a single carbon from the carboxyl end. In humans, alpha-oxidation is used in peroxisomes to break down dietary phytanic acid, which cannot undergo beta-oxidation due to its β-methyl branch, into pristanic acid. Pristanic acid can then acquire acetyl-CoA and subsequently become beta oxidized, yielding propionyl-CoA.

Pathway
Alpha-oxidation of phytanic acid is believed to take place entirely within peroxisomes. 
Phytanic acid is first attached to CoA to form phytanoyl-CoA.
Phytanoyl-CoA is oxidized by phytanoyl-CoA dioxygenase, in a process using Fe2+ and O2, to yield 2-hydroxyphytanoyl-CoA.
2-hydroxyphytanoyl-CoA is cleaved by 2-hydroxyphytanoyl-CoA lyase in a TPP-dependent reaction to form pristanal and formyl-CoA (in turn later broken down into formate and eventually CO2).
Pristanal is oxidized by aldehyde dehydrogenase to form pristanic acid (which can then undergo beta-oxidation).
(Propionyl-CoA is released as a result of beta oxidation when the beta carbon is substituted)

Deficiency
Enzymatic deficiency in alpha-oxidation (most frequently in phytanoyl-CoA dioxygenase) leads to Refsum's disease, in which the accumulation of phytanic acid and its derivatives leads to neurological damage. Other disorders of peroxisome biogenesis also prevent alpha-oxidation from occurring.

References

 
 

Biochemistry
Cell biology
Metabolic pathways
Fatty acids